The following are lists of demons:

 List of theological demons, in religions that consider them to be demons, and in some cases also consider them deities
 List of demons in the Ars Goetia, in the 17th century grimoire The Lesser Key of Solomon
 List of spirits appearing in grimoires (mentions demons several times)
 List of demons in fiction, demons from fiction with authors and book or other fictional work that they occur in
 List of films about demons, demon-themed films

See also
 Lists of angels